The 2001 Asian Speed Skating Championships were held between 2 December and 3 December 2000 at Heilongjiang Indoor Rink in Harbin, China PR.

Women championships

Day 1

Day 2

Allround Results

Men championships

Day 1

Day 2

Allround Results

References
Men's result
Women's result

Asian Speed Skating Championships
Sport in Harbin
2001 in speed skating
International speed skating competitions hosted by China
Asian Speed Skating Championships